The Notebook is a 2004 American romantic drama film directed by Nick Cassavetes, with a screenplay by Jeremy Leven and Jan Sardi, based on the 1996 novel of the same name by Nicholas Sparks. The film stars Ryan Gosling and Rachel McAdams as a young couple who fall in love in the 1940s. Their story is read from a notebook in the present day by an elderly man, telling the tale to a fellow nursing home resident.

The Notebook received generally mixed reviews, but performed well at the box office and received a number of award nominations, winning eight Teen Choice Awards, a Satellite Award, and an MTV Movie Award. The film became a sleeper hit and has gained a cult following. On November 11, 2012, ABC Family premiered an extended version with deleted scenes added back into the original storyline.

Plot
At a modern-day nursing home, an elderly man named Duke reads a romantic story from his notebook to a female patient, which tells the following:

In 1940, at a carnival in Seabrook Island, South Carolina, poor lumber mill worker Noah Calhoun sees 17-year-old heiress Allison "Allie" Hamilton, who is spending the summer in town with her parents. He pursues her and they begin a summer romance. One night, Allie goes to Noah's house and meets his father, Frank Calhoun, who immediately likes her. A few days later, Noah is invited to a luncheon at Allie's house by her parents, John and Anne Hamilton, but they are unimpressed with Noah because he doesn't fit in with the other wealthy attendees. The same night, Noah takes Allie to an abandoned house called The Windsor Plantation. He tells her he intends to buy and restore the house for themselves. As the sun sets, they share a romantic moment and Allie asks Noah to make love to her for the first time. But then she grows nervous and starts rambling. They are interrupted by Noah's friend, Fin who informs them that Allie's parents have the police out looking for her. When Allie and Noah return to her parents' mansion, particularly Allie's mother, Anne makes it clear that they do not approve of the relationship and forbid her from seeing him. Overhearing all the insults and how Allie's mother describes him as trash, Noah leaves and Allie goes after him. An argument ensues and Allie breaks up with Noah but she immediately regrets it and tries to stop him. The next morning, Anne announces that the family would be returning home to Charleston and they would be leaving in a while. Allie tries to find Noah at work but fails. So she asks Fin to tell him she loves him. Noah rushes to Allie's house after Fin gives him the message but finds the gates locked.

Noah writes a letter to Allie every day for a year but Allie's mother hides them. When all of Noah's 365 letters go unanswered, Noah stops writing and decides to move on. He enlists with Fin to fight in World War II, Battle of the Bulge where Fin loses his life in battle. Allie volunteers as a nurse in a hospital for wounded soldiers where she meets Captain Lon Hammond Jr., a young lawyer who comes from old Southern money. After a few years, the two become engaged, much to the delight of Allie's parents.

Noah returns from the war to find that his father had sold their home so Noah could afford to buy The Windsor Plantation. He convinces himself that if he restores the house, Allie will find her way back to him. Despite completing the house, Noah restrains from selling it to any buyers.  While Allie tries on her wedding dress, she sees a photo of Noah in a newspaper where he stands smiling in front of the renovated house. She faints.

Allie is overwhelmed with the memories of summer romance and unresolved feelings for Noah and seeks permission from Lon to take a solo trip before the wedding. She returns to Seabrook to find Noah living in their dream house. The two rekindle and consummate their relationship. Allie learns about the letters Noah had written to her and she realizes she never got them. Several days later, Allie's mother appears on Noah's doorstep to warn Allie that Lon has followed her to Seabrook. She also reveals that like her daughter, she once loved a lower-class young man in Seabrook and still thinks about him and how their lives might have been different had she chosen better. She hands over Noah's letters to Allie and tells her she hopes Allie makes the right choice. Noah and Allie get into a heated argument where the former forces the latter to think about what she wants and to stick by it no matter how hard it is. Allie makes the difficult choice to drive back to her hotel and confess her infidelity to Lon. Lon says he still loves her and wants her back for himself but even though she knows she shouldn't leave Lon, she decides to follow her heart and returns to Noah.

In the present, the elderly woman listening to the story is revealed to be Allie, now suffering from dementia. Noah who now goes by Duke so as not to startle her in her disoriented state, is her husband. During the early stages of her illness, Allie had written a journal detailing their romance and life together so he could read it to her to help her come back to him. Noah has kept the promise by reading to her almost every day. One day, when he is almost at the end of the story, reading from the notebook, she briefly recognizes him. She asks how long they have before she forgets again and Duke tells her they have no more than five minutes. They dance to their song, "I'll Be Seeing You" and she asks him about their kids. But Allie's dementia quickly relapses and she panics to see a stranger touching her. The medical personnel sedate her to control her hysterical reaction. Duke has a heart attack and is treated in the nursing home while Allie is taken to rest in the dementia ward. Upon recovering and despite not being allowed in, Duke goes to Allie's room in the night and watches her sleep. She instantly recognizes him again. They kiss, hold hands and fall asleep. In the morning, the nurse discovers both of them dead in their sleep, still holding hands.

Cast
 Ryan Gosling as Noah Calhoun
 James Garner as Old Noah / Duke
 Rachel McAdams as Allison "Allie" Calhoun (née Hamilton)
 Gena Rowlands as Old Allie
 Joan Allen as Anne Hamilton 
 James Marsden as Lon Hammond, Jr.
 Jamie Brown as Martha Shaw
 Sam Shepard as Frank Calhoun
 David Thornton as John Hamilton
 Kevin Connolly as Fin 
 Heather Wahlquist as Sara Tuffington
 Ed Grady as Harry
 Obba Babatunde as Bandleader

Production
The film rights to Nicholas Sparks's novel were acquired by New Line Cinema in 1996, represented by producer Mark Johnson. Jeremy Leven was hired to write the script, which caught the attention of director Steven Spielberg in 1998, who wished to film it with Tom Cruise as Noah Calhoun. Spielberg's commitment to other projects led to Jim Sheridan becoming attached to direct the following year. Filming was to start in 1999 but pushed back over rewrites. Sheridan eventually backed out by October 2000 to work on In America. Martin Campbell entered negotiations to direct in March 2001, before he was replaced by Nick Cassavetes a year later. Early in development George Clooney was going play Noah, and Paul Newman the older Noah, but after Clooney watched some Paul Newman movies he went up to Paul and said he didn't look like him.

Casting
Cassavetes wanted someone unknown and "not handsome" to portray Noah; he therefore cast Ryan Gosling in the role. Gosling was initially surprised by this: "I read [the script] and I thought, 'He's crazy. I couldn't be more wrong for this movie.'" "It gave me an opportunity to play a character over a period of time – from 1940 to 1946 – that was quite profound and formative." To prepare for the part, Gosling temporarily moved to Charleston, South Carolina prior to filming. During two months, he rowed the Ashley River and made furniture. A nationwide search was conducted to find the right actress to play Allie. Actresses who auditioned for the role included Jessica Biel, Britney Spears, Ashley Judd, and Reese Witherspoon, and Rachel McAdams was ultimately cast. On casting her, Cassavetes said: "When Rachel McAdams came in and read, it was apparent that she was the one. She and Ryan had great chemistry between them." She commented: "I thought it would be a dream to be able to do it. I read the script and went into the audition just two days later. It was a good way to do it, because I was very full of the story." Gosling commented that, "I think that it's pretty fair to say that we probably wouldn't have made the film if we hadn't found Rachel... Really, Allie drives the movie. It's her movie and we're in it. It all kind of depended on an actress." In comparison to the book, the role was extended. McAdams spent time in Charleston before filming to familiarize herself with the surroundings, and took ballet and etiquette classes. She had a dialect coach to learn the Southern accent.

Filming
The Notebook was filmed mostly on location in South Carolina, in late 2002 and early 2003, as well as the wintery battlefield just outside Montreal. Production offices for the film were set up at the old Charleston Naval Base in North Charleston.

Much of the film's plot takes place in and around Seabrook Island, an actual town which is one of the South Carolina "sea islands". However, none of the filming took place in the Seabrook area. The house that Noah is seen fixing up is a private residence at Wadmalaw Island, South Carolina, which is another "sea island" locality situated  closer to Charleston. The house was not actually in a dilapidated state at any time, but it was made to look that way by special effects in the first half of the film. Contrary to the suggestion in the film's dialogue, neither the house nor the Seabrook area was home to South Carolina Revolutionary hero Francis Marion, whose plantation was actually located some distance northwest of Charleston. The Boone Hall Plantation served as Allie's summer house.

Many of the scenes set in Seabrook were filmed in the town of Mt. Pleasant, (a suburb of Charleston). Others were filmed in Charleston and in Edisto Island. The lake scenes were filmed at Cypress Gardens (in Moncks Corner, South Carolina) with trained birds that were brought in from elsewhere.

The nursing home scenes were filmed at Rice Hope Plantation, located in Georgetown County, South Carolina. The college depicted briefly in the film is identified in the film as Sarah Lawrence College, but the campus that is seen is actually the College of Charleston.

Music
The soundtrack to The Notebook was released on June 8, 2004.

Reception

Box office
The film was released June 25, 2004 in the United States and Canada and grossed $13.5 million from 2,303 theaters in its opening weekend, ranking number 4 at the box office. The film grossed a total of $115.6 million worldwide, $81 million in Canada and the United States and $34.6 million in other countries. It is the 15th highest-grossing romantic drama film of all-time.

Critical response

According to review aggregator Rotten Tomatoes, 53% of 179 critics gave the film a positive review, with an average rating of 5.7/10. The website's critics consensus reads, "It's hard not to admire its unabashed sentimentality, but The Notebook is too clumsily manipulative to rise above its melodramatic clichés." Metacritic assigned the film a weighted average score of 53 out of 100, based on 34 critics, indicating "mixed or average reviews". Audiences polled by CinemaScore gave the film an average grade of "A" on an A+ to F scale.

Roger Ebert of the Chicago Sun-Times praised the film, awarding it three-and-a-half stars out of four, calling the photography "striking in its rich, saturated effects" and stating that the "actors are blessed by good material." Peter Lowry of Film Threat gave the film three-and-a-half stars out of five; praising the performances of both Gosling and McAdams, he wrote: "Gosling and especially McAdams give all-star performances, doing just enough to hand the reins over to the pros, who take what's left of the film and finish the audience off with some touching scenes that don't leave a dry eye in the house." About the film itself he added: "Overall, The Notebook is a surprisingly good film that manages to succeed where many other "chick flick" like romances fail."

Stephen Holden of The New York Times gave the film a positive review, stating that "the scenes between the young lovers confronting adult authority have the same seething tension and lurking hysteria that the young Warren Beatty and Natalie Wood brought more than 40 years ago to their roles in Splendor in the Grass." Ann Hornaday of The Washington Post also gave the film a positive review, she also praised the performances of Gosling and McAdams, stating: "Never mind that McAdams and Gosling don't for a minute call to mind 1940s America; they're both suitably attractive and appealing. Gosling, who delivered a searing and largely unseen screen debut performance in the 2001 drama The Believer, is particularly convincing as a young man who charms his way past a girl's strongest defenses." About the film, she added: "Audiences craving big, gooey over-the-top romance have their must-see summer movie in The Notebook." William Arnold of the Seattle Post-Intelligencer praised the performance of McAdams but criticized the performance of Gosling, stating that he "just doesn't have the kind of star power or chemistry with McAdams to anchor this kind of minor-league Gone with the Wind." He also added about the film that it "doesn't completely work on its own terms, mainly because its romantic casting just doesn't spark: It doesn't make us fall in love with its lovers." Wesley Morris of The Boston Globe gave the film two-and-a-half stars, praising the performances of its cast members, writing about McAdams that "she's soulfully committed to the suds in the story and fiercely attentive to the other actors". He added about Gosling: "Gosling is adept at playing sociopaths and intense brooders, and there's reason to think, early on, that Noah might be similarly off, as when he threatens to drop from a Ferris wheel unless Allie agrees to go on a date with him." About the film, he wrote: "Considering the sunny, relatively pleasurable romantic business that precedes it, the elderly stuff seems dark, morbid, and forced upon us."

Jessica Winter of The Village Voice gave the film a mixed review, stating: "Amid the sticky-sweet swamp of Jeremy Leven's script, Rowlands and Garner emerge spotless and beatific, lending a magnanimous credibility to their scenes together. These two old pros slice cleanly through the thicket of sap-weeping dialogue and contrivance, locating the terror and desolation wrought by the cruel betrayals of a failing mind." Robert Koehler of Variety also gave the film a mixed review, he however, praised the performances, writing that "already one of the most intriguing young thesps, Gosling extends his range to pure romance without sacrificing a bit of his naturally subversive qualities, and even seems comfortable looking beautiful in a manly American way. The head-turner is McAdams, doing such a different perf from her top bitch in Mean Girls that it's hard to tell it's the same actor. She skillfully carries much of the film's emotional weight with a free and easy manner."

In June 2010, Entertainment Weekly included Allie and Noah in its list of the "100 Greatest Characters of the Last 20 Years." The periodical listed The Notebook in their 25 Sexiest Movies Ever. Us Weekly included the film in its list of the 30 Most Romantic Movies of All Time. Boston.com ranked the film the third Top Romantic Movie. The Notebook appeared on Moviefone list of the 25 Best Romance Movies of All Time. Marie Claire also put the film on its list of the 12 Most Romantic Movie Scenes of All Time. In 2011, The Notebook was named the best chick-flick during ABC News and People television special Best in Film: The Greatest Movies of Our Time. The scene where Noah climbs the Ferris Wheel because he wants a date with Allie made the list of Total Film 50 Most Romantic Movie Moments of All Time. The kiss in the rain was ranked No. 4 in Total Film 50 Best Movie Kisses list.

Accolades

Home media
The Notebook was released on VHS and DVD on February 8, 2005, and Blu-ray on May 4, 2010. By February 2010, the film had sold over 11 million copies on DVD.

In February 2019, subscribers to the UK version of Netflix reported that the version of the film on the streaming service had an alternate ending, which substituted a more light-hearted conclusion than the emotional end of the original release. Netflix responded that this alternate version of the film had been supplied to them in error, and soon replaced it with the original version.

Television series
On August 11, 2015, it was reported that a television series was in development by The CW. The series was to follow Noah and Allie's courtship following the events of the film, and in a post-WWII world. As of 2022, it has yet to air.

Stage musical 
On January 3, 2019, Ingrid Michaelson announced she would be lyricist for a musical adaption of The Notebook with a book by Bekah Brunstetter. Sparks will also be involved as a producer alongside Kevin McCollum and Kurt Deutsch.

The production was initially slated for fall 2020, but was delayed by the COVID-19 pandemic.  Michelson and Brunsletter used the additional time to hold online previews and tweak their work.

The musical opened October 6, 2022 at the Chicago Shakespeare Theatre and received generally positive reviews. Stephen Oxman of the Chicago Sun-Times said, "I simply was not expecting to fall in love with 'The Notebook,'... But I have." Adding, "It’s a significant leap in artistic quality over its sources, which it respects, while also providing a clear, resonant, and unique voice of its own." Jonathan Abarbanel of Theater Mania noted what while the musical used the novel for its basis rather than the film, he noted that Michelson and Brunstetter shifted the time period twenty years to begin in the late 1960s causing Noah to leave for the Vietnam War rather than World War II.  the production is expected to close October 30 and transfer to Broadway at a future date.

References

External links

 
 
 
 

2004 films
2000s coming-of-age drama films
2004 romantic drama films
American coming-of-age drama films
American romantic drama films
Films about Alzheimer's disease
Films about interclass romance
Films based on romance novels
Films based on works by Nicholas Sparks
Films directed by Nick Cassavetes
Films scored by Aaron Zigman
Films set in Charleston, South Carolina
Films set in South Carolina
Films set in the 1940s
Films shot in Los Angeles
Films shot in Montreal
Films shot in South Carolina
American historical romance films
New Line Cinema films
American World War II films
Films set in a movie theatre
2000s English-language films
2000s American films